The FIBT World Championships 1973 took place in Lake Placid, New York, United States for the fourth time, hosting the event previously in 1949, 1961, and 1969.

Two man bobsleigh

Four man bobsleigh

Medal table

References
2-Man bobsleigh World Champions
4-Man bobsleigh World Champions

IBSF World Championships
International sports competitions hosted by the United States
Sports in Lake Placid, New York
1973 in bobsleigh
Bobsleigh in the United States 
1973 in American sports